

487001–487100 

|-bgcolor=#f2f2f2
| colspan=4 align=center | 
|}

487101–487200 

|-bgcolor=#f2f2f2
| colspan=4 align=center | 
|}

487201–487300 

|-bgcolor=#f2f2f2
| colspan=4 align=center | 
|}

487301–487400 

|-bgcolor=#f2f2f2
| colspan=4 align=center | 
|}

487401–487500 

|-bgcolor=#f2f2f2
| colspan=4 align=center | 
|}

487501–487600 

|-bgcolor=#f2f2f2
| colspan=4 align=center | 
|}

487601–487700 

|-id=617
| 487617 Ingethiering ||  || Inge Thiering (born 1962) is a high school teacher in Neckargemuend, Germany, who for many years has undertaken astronomical research programs with her students, including successful asteroid searches. Name suggested by D. D. Winnikes and M. Tritsch. || 
|}

487701–487800 

|-id=761
| 487761 Frankbrandner ||  || Frank Brandner (1961–2014) was an inspiring teacher and photographer at the Otto-Schott-Gymnasium in Jena, Germany, who encouraged his students to excel in astronomy, including the discovery of minor planets. Name suggested by C. Liefke and students from the Otto-Schott-Gymnasium. || 
|}

487801–487900 

|-bgcolor=#f2f2f2
| colspan=4 align=center | 
|}

487901–488000 

|-bgcolor=#f2f2f2
| colspan=4 align=center | 
|}

References 

487001-488000